Mount Ash is an Antarctica mountain, 2,025 m, in the Darwin Mountains, overlooking the north side of Hatherton Glacier 11 nautical miles (20 km) west-southwest of Junction Spur. Mapped by the United States Geological Survey (USGS) from tellurometer surveys and Navy air photos, 1959–63. Named by Advisory Committee on Antarctic Names (US-ACAN) for Ralph E. Ash, mechanic, a member of the U.S. McMurdo-Pole traverse party, 1960–61.

Further reading 
 WARWICK F. VINCENT, CLIVE HOWARD-WILLIAMS, Nitrate-rich inland waters of the Ross Ice Shelf region, Antarctica, Antarctic Science 6 (3): 339-346 (1994), P 340
 Lorna Louise Thurston, A PILOT FRAMEWORK AND GAP ANALYSIS TOWARDS DEVELOPING A FLUVIAL CLASSIFICATION SYSTEM IN THE ROSS SEA REGION ANTARCTICA, P 23

References 

Mountains of Oates Land
East Antarctica